Iridomyrmex rubriceps is a species of ant in the genus Iridomyrmex. Described by Forel in 1902, the species is endemic to Australia, living in rainforest and wet sclerophyll habitats, commonly seen in the east coast of the country.

References

Iridomyrmex
Hymenoptera of Australia
Insects described in 1902